Monroe Jackson Rathbone V (born December 14, 1984) is an American actor, singer, and musician best known for his role as Jasper Hale in The Twilight Saga film series. From 2008 to 2012, he was the vocalist and occasional guitarist, bassist, drummer, and keyboardist of the funk rock band 100 Monkeys.

Early life
Monroe Jackson Rathbone V was born in Singapore on December 14, 1984, the son of American parents Randee Lynn (née Brauner) and Monroe Jackson Rathbone IV. He has three sisters, including ceramic artist Kelly Rathbone. He is distantly related to Civil War general Stonewall Jackson and English actor Basil Rathbone, being descended from the Rathbone family of Liverpool. His great-grandfather, Monroe Jackson Rathbone II, was the chairman of Standard Oil, which later became Exxon. Because of his father's job at Mobil Oil took the family to different places, he lived in Singapore, Norway, and Indonesia before settling in Midland, Texas. 

Rathbone attended the Trinity School of Midland and started out in local theater with the Pickwick Players youth actors program, initially doing musical theater. For his junior and senior years of high school, he attended the Interlochen Arts Academy in Interlochen, Michigan, where he majored in acting. After graduation, he planned to further study acting at the Royal Conservatoire of Scotland in Glasgow, but was rejected and instead decided to move to Los Angeles to look for acting work.

Career

After being in Los Angeles for a short time, Rathbone was cast in Disney 411, where he interviewed up-and-coming personalities like Hilary Duff and the sister duo Aly & AJ. He also had guest roles on The O.C. and Close to Home. His film roles include work in Molding Clay, Pray for Morning, and Travis and Henry. In 2005, he got the role of Nicholas Fiske in ABC Family's original series Beautiful People. In a 2008 interview, he stated it was his first leading role and was his most difficult role to fit into. Rathbone also played a role in Criminal Minds as Adam and Amanda.

In 2008, he played Jasper Hale in the film Twilight, based on the best-selling novel by Stephenie Meyer. He reprised his role in the sequels to Twilight, The Twilight Saga: New Moon, The Twilight Saga: Eclipse and The Twilight Saga: Breaking Dawn – Part 1 and Part 2. In 2009, Rathbone played Jeremy in S. Darko. In addition to that role, he won kudos for his performance as a serial killer on Criminal Minds. Rathbone played the role of Sokka in The Last Airbender, a 2010 film based on the animated series. Though the film was a commercial hit, it was universally panned by critics. Among the criticism was the casting of Rathbone, whose character drew inspiration from Inuit. Rathbone himself is not of Inuit descent. 

Rathbone formerly performed in a funk band called 100 Monkeys with two friends whom he met in high school at Interlochen Arts Academy, Ben Graupner and Ben Johnson, as well as close friends Jerad Anderson and M. Lawrence Abrams ("Uncle Larry"). Jackson plays the guitar, bass, drums, keyboard, mandolin, trumpet, harmonica and is on vocals. The band released three albums in 2009. In December 2009, 100 Monkeys began a 100-city tour that took them to nearly every state in the US by mid-2010. The band continued to tour into 2011 to coincide with the release of their new album, Liquid Zoo, which was released in June. The band headed overseas for their first international dates in winter 2011.

Rathbone appeared in an episode of No Ordinary Family on November 9, 2010. In November 2010, it was reported he had been cast in the Warner Premiere and Dolphin Entertainment action comedy web series Aim High alongside Aimee Teegarden. The show in which he portrays Nick Green, a high school junior who's just starting a new school year as one of the country's 64 highly trained teenage operatives, premiered on October 18, 2011, on Facebook being the first "social series" ever created.

In May 2011, Rathbone began shooting Live at the Foxes Den, a film in which he plays the lead role of lawyer Bobby Kelly. In November 2014, Rathbone joined the cast of Pali Road. Rathbone has a production company, PatchMo Entertainment, and a record company, Happy Jack Records.

Charity work
Rathbone is an honorary board member for Little Kids Rock, a national nonprofit that works to restore and revitalize music education in disadvantaged U.S. public schools. He has shown support for the organization in several ways, including donating a signed Twilight script for auction, visiting a Little Kids Rock classroom, and delivering instruments to students.

Personal life
Rathbone married his Iraqi-American girlfriend, Sheila Hafsadi, on September 29, 2013. They reside in Alpharetta, Georgia, and have three children: a son born July 5, 2012, a daughter born May 31, 2016, and son born December 31, 2019. His close friend and Twilight co-star Nikki Reed is the godmother of their oldest son.

On September 18, 2014, Rathbone was on a jetBlue flight to Austin from Long Beach when its engine exploded. The plane returned to Long Beach for an emergency landing. There were four injuries, but all passengers survived.

Filmography

Film

Television

Web

References

External links

 
 

1984 births
Living people
Male actors from Texas
American male film actors
Male models from Texas
American expatriates in Norway
American expatriates in Indonesia
American rock singers
American multi-instrumentalists
American male television actors
People from Midland, Texas
Singaporean emigrants to the United States
21st-century American male actors
Jackson
Singaporean people of American descent